Aedon Scipio is a professional football player from Anguilla who plays for the Anguilla national team.

Career

Youth
Scipio showed promise as a young player by winning a skills competition for primary schoolers which was sponsored by the National Bank of Anguilla.

Club
As of 2020, Scipio played for Roaring Lions FC of the AFA League. He was named Man of the Match for his performance against Docs United FC in August. The team went on to win the championship that season.

International
Scipio represented Anguilla at the youth level during 2007 CONCACAF U17 Tournament qualification. He made his senior international debut on 21 March 2021 in a friendly against the United States Virgin Islands. He made his competitive debut six days later in a 2022 FIFA World Cup qualification loss to the Dominican Republic.

Career statistics

International

Personal
Scipio resides in London and has a BA from the University of Hull.

References

External links
National Football Teams profile

Living people
Anguillan footballers
Anguilla international footballers
Association football forwards
AFA Senior Male League players
1991 births
Roaring Lions FC players
Alumni of the University of Hull